Heron Lake is a city in Jackson County, Minnesota, United States. The population was 698 at the 2010 census.

History
Heron Lake was named in 1870 after a local lake where great blue herons were seen.

Heron Lake was named after the Black-Crowned Night Heron.

Geography

Minnesota State Highway 60 serves as a main route in the community.

Demographics

2010 census
As of the census of 2010, there were 698 people, 306 households, and 164 families residing in the city. The racial makeup of the city was 92.1% White, 1.9% African American, 1.3% Native American, 0.3% Asian, 4.2% from other races, and 0.3% from two or more races. Hispanic or Latino of any race were 12.0% of the population.

There were 306 households, of which 28.8% had children under the age of 18 living with them, 44.8% were married couples living together, 6.5% had a female householder with no husband present, 2.3% had a male householder with no wife present, and 46.4% were non-families. 39.5% of all households were made up of individuals, and 23.2% had someone living alone who was 65 years of age or older. The average household size was 2.28 and the average family size was 3.12.

The median age in the city was 41.5 years. 23.8% of residents were under the age of 18; 9.6% were between the ages of 18 and 24; 21.9% were from 25 to 44; 26% were from 45 to 64; and 18.8% were 65 years of age or older. The gender makeup of the city was 50.4% male and 49.6% female.

2000 census
As of the census of 2000, there were 768 people, 285 households, and 174 families residing in the city. The racial makeup of the city was 92.58% White, 0.52% Asian, 6.38% from other races, and 0.52% from two or more races. Hispanic or Latino of any race were 10.55% of the population.

There were 285 households, out of which 32.6% had children under the age of 18 living with them, 51.9% were married couples living together, 6.3% had a female householder with no husband present, and 38.9% were non-families. 34.4% of all households were made up of individuals, and 17.2% had someone living alone who was 65 years of age or older.  The average household size was 2.52 and the average family size was 3.30.

In the city, the population was spread out, with 26.7% under the age of 18, 7.6% from 18 to 24, 25.4% from 25 to 44, 15.9% from 45 to 64, and 24.5% who were 65 years of age or older.  The median age was 39 years. For every 100 females, there were 97.9 males.  For every 100 females age 18 and over, there were 97.5 males.

The median income for a household in the city was $32,222, and the median income for a family was $40,625. Males had a median income of $28,958 versus $19,219 for females. The per capita income for the city was $15,657.

Notable people
Roman Catholic Bishop Frederick William Freking of the Diocese of La Crosse was born in rural Heron Lake. Bishop Freking was one of 19 children of his father (by two wives), and the Bishop's brothers' and sisters' descendants, through blood and marriage, include a very large percentage of the inhabitants of the town. Many descendants of the Bishop's father have distinguished themselves outside the area, including Blake Freking, who has finished (but not won) the Iditarod dog-sled race at least twice.

Walter Mondale, Vice-President of the United States under Jimmy Carter (1977–1981) and the Democratic Party's nominee for President in 1984, attended Heron Lake Public High School and lived in the Methodist Episcopal Church parsonage, since moved, for three years prior to 1946. His father was minister at the church during that time. At that time, Protestants were vigorously discriminated against by the majority of Catholics, including frequent 'boys-will-be-boys' raids against the parsonage where Mondale lived.

Inkpaduta, a Sioux Indian leader in the area from the 1850s until his departure to join Sitting Bull's band in Manitoba and Saskatchewan, camped at the south end of the lake that gives the town its name both before and after his participation in the Spirit Lake massacre of 1857, and the Dakota War of 1862, also known as the Sioux uprising. Local oral history, not known to have been published, records that Inkpaduta camped at the "lone oak" adjacent to the lake, and that the same site became the pioneer home of the Peter (sometimes 'Peters') family, still to this day the most-ancient still-surviving European-American family identified with the town of Heron Lake.

Walter Abel, an actor of some success in the first half of the twentieth century, lived in the town for some part of his formative years. His earliest and probably best-known role was as D'Artagnan in 1935 version of The Three Musketeers. Much of his reputation was built on his ability to die dramatically (such as by falling off a building) when shot on film. No one extant in the town in 2017 even knows anyone who ever met him, based on the ambient knowledge of a local person.

Harvey Edwin Swennes (1899-1964), newspaper editor, publisher, and Minnesota state legislator, was born in Heron Lake.

Politics
Heron Lake is located in Minnesota's 1st congressional district, represented by Republican Jim Hagedorn.  At the state level, Heron Lake is located in Senate District 22, represented by Republican Bill Weber (politician), and in House District 22B, represented by Republican Rod Hamilton.

References

External links
Heron Lake, Minnesota

Cities in Minnesota
Cities in Jackson County, Minnesota